This is a list of notable events in country music that took place in 1960.

Events
 February 1 – Loretta Lynn signs her very first record deal with Zero Records. This launches the singer into the fame of the country music world. 
 March 29 — Tootsie's Orchid Lounge, destined to become one of the most prominent of the honky tonk bars in Nashville, Tennessee, opens.
 August 27 — Louisiana Hayride puts on its final performance.
 September 24 — Final telecast of ABC-TV's Jubilee USA.
 November 5 — Johnny Horton is killed in a car accident near Milano, Texas, while returning from a concert in nearby Austin. Other passengers in his car – manager Tillman Franks and guitarist Tommy Tomlinson – are injured but survive.

No dates
Just four songs – five, if one counts "El Paso" by Marty Robbins, which spent five of its seven weeks at No. 1 in 1960 – ascend to the No. 1 spot on Billboard'''s Hot C&W Sides chart. Those songs – listed below – would spend 14, 14, 12 and 10 weeks at No. 1.
 Compare that to 10 No. 1 songs in 1959 and eight for all of 1961. Just a quarter of a century later, it was common for 50 songs per year to play musical chairs atop Billboards Hot Country Singles chart.
The Chicago-based National Barn Dance moves from WLS to WGN-AM, where it will remain for the rest of its run.
The Porter Wagoner Show, one of the most successful country music television programs, premieres on CBS late in the year. Norma Jean (Beasler) and comedian Speck Rhodes were the regulars, with guest performers appearing each week. The show ran in syndication for 21 years, and at its peak aired in more than 100 markets, and is largely credited for breaking the career of a young singer named Dolly Parton (who replaced Norma Jean in 1967).

Top hits of the year

Number-one hits

United States
(as certified by Billboard)

Notes
 No. 1 song of the year, as determined by Billboard.
 Song dropped from No. 1 and later returned to top spot.
 Last Billboard No. 1 hit for that artist.
 Only Billboard No. 1 hit for that artist to date.

Other major hits

Top new album releases

Other album releases

Births
 February 10 — Lionel Cartwright, neotraditionalist of the late 1980s and early 1990s.
 February 16 — Doug Phelps, lead singer of the Kentucky Headhunters.
 April 8 — John Schneider, singer and actor, best known for his 1980s hits and role as Bo Duke on CBS-TV series The Dukes of Hazzard.
 August 22 — Collin Raye, a favorite country artist of the 1990s.
 September 26 — Doug Supernaw, singer of the early 1990s ("I Don't Call Him Daddy") (d. 2020)
 November 4 — Kim Forester, member of The Forester Sisters.
 November 25 — Amy Grant, contemporary Christian singer, wife of Vince Gill.
 December 28 — Marty Roe, lead singer of Diamond Rio.
 December 28 — Marcus Hummon, Grammy Award-winning singer-songwriter ("Bless the Broken Road")

Deaths
January 19 — Ralph Peer, 67, pioneer in record engineering and production (pneumonia).
May 13 — Gid Tanner, 74, fiddler and leader of pioneering country group the Skillet Lickers.
November 5 — Johnny Horton, 35, "The Singing Fisherman" and best known for his Americana-styled hits (car accident).
November 7 — A.P. Carter, 68, a member of The Original Carter Family, one of country music's all-time pioneers (heart disease).

Major awards

Grammy AwardsBest Country and Western Performance''' — "El Paso", Marty Robbins

See also
Country Music Association

Further reading
Kingsbury, Paul, "The Grand Ole Opry: History of Country Music. 70 Years of the Songs, the Stars and the Stories," Villard Books, Random House; Opryland USA, 1995
Kingsbury, Paul, "Vinyl Hayride: Country Music Album Covers 1947–1989," Country Music Foundation, 2003
Millard, Bob, "Country Music: 70 Years of America's Favorite Music," HarperCollins, New York, 1993
Whitburn, Joel, "Top Country Songs 1944–2005 – 6th Edition." 2005.

References

Country
Country music by year